The 2019 Asian Road Cycling Championships was held in Tashkent, Uzbekistan from 23 to 28 April 2019.

Medal summary

Men

Women

Medal table

References

External links
 Results 

Asian Cycling Championships
Asia
2019 in Uzbekistani sport
Road Cycling Championships
International sports competitions hosted by Uzbekistan
Asian Cycling Championships